Nafisa Muminova (born 1 February 1990 in Tashkent) is a chess player from Uzbekistan.
She won the women's Uzbekistani Chess Championship in 2008 2009, and 2011, won silver medals in the 2008 Asian Youth Championship and as first board in the team event at the 2010 Asian Games, and competed in the Women's World Chess Championship in 2008 and 2010. She is a Woman Grandmaster, the first woman from Uzbekistan to reach that title.

References

External links
 
 Interview with Nafisa Muminova, September 2013

1990 births
Living people
Uzbekistani chess players
Chess woman grandmasters
Asian Games medalists in chess
Chess players at the 2010 Asian Games

Asian Games silver medalists for Uzbekistan
Medalists at the 2010 Asian Games